Jared L. Brush (July 6, 1835 – April 24, 1913) was the ninth Lieutenant Governor of Colorado. He was a Republican and served from 1895 to 1899 under governors Albert Washington McIntire and Alva Adams.

He was born in Clermont County, Ohio,  on July 6, 1835. He moved to Iowa and then to Greeley, Colorado, arriving in 1859. He was a prospector and rancher, who developed early irrigation systems and encouraged agricultural associations. He served as sheriff of Weld County in 1871, as a county commissioner from 1874 to 1877, and as a state assemblyman from 1879 to 1893. In 1896 he became a banker but continued to encourage agriculture and education, securing a state normal school for Greeley (later Colorado State Teachers College, now the University of Northern Colorado). He died April 24, 1913, in Greeley.

References

County commissioners in Colorado
Lieutenant Governors of Colorado
1835 births
1913 deaths
People from Greeley, Colorado
People from Clermont County, Ohio
Colorado Republicans
19th-century American politicians